Falkenhausen may refer to:–
 Ludwig von Falkenhausen (1844–1936), German general, Governor-General of the General Governorate of Belgium (1917–1918)
 Alexander von Falkenhausen (1878–1966), German general, Military Governor of Occupied Belgium (1940–1944), nephew of Ludwig
 Friedrich von Falkenhausen (1869–1946), Regierungspräsident of Potsdam (1914), son of Ludwig
 Gotthard von Falkenhausen (1899–1982), banker, son of Friedrich
 Hans-Joachim von Falkenhausen (1893–1934), German SA-general, brother of Alexander.
 Lothar von Falkenhausen, sinologist

de:Falkenhausen